Koji Hachisuka (蜂須賀 孝治, born 20 July 1990) is a Japanese football defender who plays for Vegalta Sendai in the J. League.

Career statistics

Club
As of 2 November 2022.

Honours
Vegalta Sendai
J1 League Runners-Up (1): 2012
Emperor's Cup Runners-Up (1): 2018

References

External links

 
Profile at Vegalta Sendai

1990 births
Living people
Sendai University alumni
Association football people from Tochigi Prefecture
Japanese footballers
J1 League players
J2 League players
Vegalta Sendai players
Association football defenders